Donald Earl Davis (born December 16, 1943 - March 8, 2018) was a former American football defensive tackle who played one season with the New York Giants of the National Football League (NFL). He was drafted by the Giants in the second round of the 1966 NFL Draft. Davis was also drafted by the San Diego Chargers in the first round of the 1966 AFL Draft. He played college football at Los Angeles State and attended Santa Ana High School in Santa Ana, California

External links
Just Sports Stats
Fanbase profile

Living people
1943 births
Players of American football from California
American football defensive tackles
Cal State Los Angeles Diablos football players
New York Giants players
Sportspeople from Santa Ana, California